Jaegerdorffsplatsen is a tram stop of the Gothenburg tram network located in Majorna, and is the last tram stop on Karl Johansgatan. After Jaegerdorffsplatsen in order to rejoin with line 11, it turns on Älvsborgsgatan.

Tram stops in Sweden